A list of films produced in Egypt in 1955. For an A-Z list of films currently on Wikipedia, see :Category:Egyptian films.

Lahn El-Wafaa (The Melody of Fulfillment) Abdel Halim Hafez, Shadia

External links
 Egyptian films of 1955 at the Internet Movie Database
 Egyptian films of 1955 elCinema.com

Lists of Egyptian films by year
1955 in Egypt
Lists of 1955 films by country or language